The following lists the events of the 1920 Philadelphia Phillies season.

Offseason 
 January 12, 1920: Mack Wheat was purchased by the Phillies from the Brooklyn Robins.

The Phillies introduced new uniforms in March 1920. The Philadelphia Inquirer reported "the new uniforms at home will be white blouses and pants, with gray stockings. A band of white will protrude about an inch above the shoe. The caps will be gray with black cords running from the peak button. On the road, the uniform will be all gray, with all white stockings."

Regular season

Season standings

Record vs. opponents

Roster

Player stats

Batting

Starters by position 
Note: Pos = Position; G = Games played; AB = At bats; H = Hits; Avg. = Batting average; HR = Home runs; RBI = Runs batted in

Other batters 
Note: G = Games played; AB = At bats; H = Hits; Avg. = Batting average; HR = Home runs; RBI = Runs batted in

Pitching

Starting pitchers 
Note: G = Games pitched; IP = Innings pitched; W = Wins; L = Losses; ERA = Earned run average; SO = Strikeouts

Other pitchers 
Note: G = Games pitched; IP = Innings pitched; W = Wins; L = Losses; ERA = Earned run average; SO = Strikeouts

Relief pitchers 
Note: G = Games pitched; W = Wins; L = Losses; SV = Saves; ERA = Earned run average; SO = Strikeouts

References

External links
1920 Philadelphia Phillies season at Baseball Reference

Philadelphia Phillies seasons
Philadelphia Phillies season
Philly